The Kumano Nada is a body of water belonging to North Pacific Ocean (Philippine Sea) located off the coast of Kumano Region of the Kii Peninsula located in central Japan.

References 

Seas of Japan